Chromaticism is a compositional technique interspersing the primary diatonic pitches and chords with other pitches of the chromatic scale. In simple terms, within each octave, diatonic music uses only seven different notes, rather than the twelve available on a standard piano keyboard. Music is chromatic when it uses more than just these seven notes.

Chromaticism is in contrast or addition to tonality or diatonicism and modality (the major and minor, or "white key", scales). Chromatic elements are considered, "elaborations of or substitutions for diatonic scale members".

Development of chromaticism

Chromaticism began to develop in the late Renaissance period, notably in the 1550s, often as part of musica reservata, in the music of Cipriano de Rore, in Orlando Lasso's Prophetiae Sibyllarum, and in the theoretical work of Nicola Vicentino.

The following timeline is abbreviated from its presentation by Benward & Saker:
Baroque Period (1600—1750) "The system of major and minor scales developed during the early part of the baroque period. This coincided with the emergence of key consciousness in music."
Classical Period (1750—1825) "The major and minor keys were the basis of music in the classical period. Chromaticism was decorative for the most part and shifts from one key to another...were used to create formal divisions."
Romantic Period (1825—1900) "Chromaticism increased to the point that the major—minor key system began to be threatened. By the end of the period, keys often shifted so rapidly in the course of a composition that tonality itself began to break down."
Post-Romantic and Impressionistic Period (1875—1920) "With the breakdown of the major—minor key system, impressionist composers began to experiment with other scales....particularly...pentatonic, modal, and whole-tone scales."
Contemporary Period (1920—present) "The chromatic scale has predominated in much of the music of our period."
Jazz and Popular Music (1900—present) "Popular music has remained the last bastion of the major-minor key system... The blues scale ["a chromatic variant of the major scale"] is often found in jazz and popular music with blues influence."

As tonality began to expand during the last half of the nineteenth century, with new combinations of chords, keys and harmonies being tried, the chromatic scale and chromaticism became more widely used, especially in the works of Richard Wagner, such as the opera "Tristan und Isolde". Increased chromaticism is often cited as one of the main causes or signs of the "breakdown" of tonality, in the form of increased importance or use of:
mode mixture
leading tones
tonicization of each chromatic step and other secondary key areas
modulatory space
hierarchical organizations of the chromatic set such as George Perle's
the use of non-tonal chords as tonic "keys"/"scales"/"areas" such as the Tristan chord.

As tonal harmony continued to widen and even break down, the chromatic scale became the basis of modern music written using the twelve-tone technique, a tone row being a specific ordering or series of the chromatic scale, and later serialism. Though these styles/methods continue to (re)incorporate tonality or tonal elements, often the trends that led to these methods were abandoned, such as modulation.

Types of chromaticism

David Cope describes three forms of chromaticism: modulation, borrowed chords from secondary keys, and chromatic chords such as augmented sixth chords.

The total chromatic is the collection of all twelve  equally tempered pitch classes of the chromatic scale.

List of chromatic chords:
Dominant seventh chords of subsidiary keys, used to create modulations to those keys (V7–I cadences)
Augmented sixth chords
Neapolitan sixth chords as chromatic subdominants
Diminished seventh chords as chromatic vii7
Altered chords
Expanded chords
Shir-Cliff, Jay, and Rauscher (1965)

Other types of chromaticity:
Pitch axis theory
Parallel scales
Nonchord tone
The minor mode in major keys (mode mixture)
Shir-Cliff, Jay, and Rauscher (1965)

Chromatic note

A chromatic note is one which does not belong to the scale of the key prevailing at the time. Similarly, a chromatic chord is one which includes one or more such notes. A chromatic and a diatonic note, or two chromatic notes, create chromatic intervals.

A chromatic scale is one which proceeds entirely by semitones, so dividing the octave into twelve equal steps of one semitone each.

Linear chromaticism is used in jazz: "All improvised lines ... will include non-harmonic, chromatic notes." Similar to in the bebop scale this may be the result of metric issues, or simply the desire to use a portion of the chromatic scale

Chromatic chord

A chromatic chord is a musical chord that includes at least one note not belonging in the diatonic scale associated with the prevailing key, the use of such chords is the use of chromatic harmony. In other words, at least one note of the chord is chromatically altered. Any chord that is not chromatic is a diatonic chord.

For example, in the key of C major, the following chords (all diatonic) are naturally built on each degree of the scale:
I = C major triad [contains pitch classes C E G]
ii = D minor triad [contains D F A]
iii = E minor triad [contains E G B]
IV = F major triad [contains F A C]
V = G major triad [contains G B D]
vi = A minor triad [contains A C E]
vii = B diminished triad [contains B D F]

However, a number of other chords may also be built on the degrees of the scale, and some of these are chromatic. Examples:
II in first inversion is called the Neapolitan sixth chord. For example in C Major: F–A–D. The Neapolitan Sixth chord resolves to the V.
The iv diminished chord is the sharpened subdominant with diminished seventh chord. For example: F–A–C–E. The IV diminished chord resolves to the V. The IV can also be understood as the tonicization of V where it functions as vii7 of the V chord, written vii7/V.
VI: The augmented sixth chord, A–C(–C, D, or E)–F, resolves to the V.
Consonant chromatic triads, modulation to these triads would be chromatic modulation:
III, VI, II, iv, vii, and VII in major
iii, vi, II, iv, ii, and vii in minor.

Chromatic line
In music theory,  is a Latin term which refers to chromatic line, often a bassline, whether descending or ascending. 

A line cliché is any chromatic line that moves against a stationary chord. There are many different types of line clichés—most often in the root, fifth or seventh—but there are two named line clichés. The major line cliché moves from the fifth of the chord to the sixth, then back to the fifth. Assuming the starting chord is the tonic, the simplest form of the major line cliché forms a I–I+–vi–I+ progression. The minor line cliché moves down from the root to the major seventh, to the minor seventh, and can continue until the fifth. 

From the late 16th century onward, chromaticism has come to symbolize intense emotional expression in music. Pierre Boulez (1986, p. 254) speaks of a long established "dualism" in Western European harmonic language: "the diatonic on the one hand and the chromatic on the other as in the time of Monteverdi and Gesualdo whose madrigals provide many examples and employ virtually the same symbolism. The chromatic symbolizing darkness doubt and grief and the diatonic light, affirmation and joy—this imagery has hardly changed for three centuries." When an interviewer asked Igor Stravinsky (1959, p. 243) if he really believed in an innate connection between "pathos" and chromaticism, the composer replied "Of course not; the association is entirely due to convention." Nevertheless the convention is a powerful one and the emotional associations evoked by chromaticism have endured and indeed strengthened over the years. To quote Cooke (1959, p. 54) "Ever since about 1850—since doubts have been cast, in intellectual circles, on the possibility, or even the desirability, of basing one's life on the concept of personal happiness—chromaticism has brought more and more painful tensions into our art-music, and finally eroded the major system and with it the whole system of tonality."

Examples of descending chromatic melodic lines that would seem to convey highly charged feeling can be found in:

Quotes
Some individual views on chromaticism include:

Connotations

Chromaticism is often associated with dissonance.

In the 16th century the repeated melodic semitone became associated with weeping, see: passus duriusculus, lament bass, and pianto.

Susan McClary (1991) argues that chromaticism in operatic and sonata form narratives can be chosen to be understood through a Marxist narrative as the "Other", racial, sexual, class or otherwise, to diatonicism's "male" self, whether through modulation, as to the secondary key area, or other means. For instance, Catherine Clément calls the chromaticism in Wagner's Isolde "feminine stink". However, McClary also contradicts herself saying that the same techniques used in opera to represent madness in women were historically highly prized in avant-garde instrumental music, "In the nineteenth-century symphony, Salomes chromatic daring is what distinguishes truly serious composition of the vanguard from mere cliché-ridden hack work." (p. 101)

See also
 20th-century music – Classical

References

External links
 Chromaticism for Jazz Guitar
 "Passus duriusculus", Bach-Cantatas.com.